California's 4th congressional district is a U.S. congressional district in California. The district is located in the northwestern part of the state, and includes all of Lake County and Napa County, most of Yolo County, and parts of Solano County and Sonoma County. Major cities in the district include Davis, Woodland, Napa, Vacaville, and most of Santa Rosa. The new 4th district is solidly Democratic, and is represented by Mike Thompson.

From 2013 to 2023, the district encompassed the Sierras from Truckee to the Sequoia National Forest, as well as a largely suburban area on the edge of the Sacramento Valley in southwestern Placer County.  It consists of Alpine, Amador, Calaveras, El Dorado, Mariposa, and Tuolumne counties plus most of Placer County and portions of Fresno, Madera, and Nevada counties. The district was represented by Republican Tom McClintock.

Competitiveness
As of 2006, Republicans had 48 percent of voter registrations, Democrats had 30 percent, and Libertarians had roughly 5 percent.

A Democratic congressional candidate nearly won the district in 2008, losing by only half a percentage point and less than 1,600 votes, indicating that the district was much more competitive than it appeared to be. But in the more recent 2018 and 2020 elections the Republican candidate won over 53% of the vote.

New district boundaries for the 2012 elections shifted the population center to the south and east.  Registered Democrats and Independents/Decline to State voters in the new district area outnumber registered Republicans by 12%. However Republicans, Independents/Decline to State and small third parties outnumber Democrats well over a 2 to 1 ratio. There are 183,800 Republicans, 117,300 Democrats and 97,200 other..

While 2018 saw 7 of California's Republican held House seats fall to Democrats, Republican Tom McClintock held his district by more than 8% over Democrat Jessica Morse.

In presidential elections, Donald Trump won the district in 2016 with 54% of the vote and won in 2020 with 53.7% of the vote.

Composition

As of 2023, California's 4th congressional district is located in the Sacramento Valley. It encompasses Lake, Napa, and Yolo Counties, and parts of Sonoma and Solano Counties.

Sonoma County is split between this district and the 2nd district. They are partitioned by Petaluma River, Highway 116, Redwood Highway, Robber Rd, Petersen Rd, Llano Rd, S Wright Rd, W College Ave, Jennings Ave, Administration Dr, Bicentennial Way, Cleveland Ave, Old Redwood Highway, Cross Creek Rd, Sonoma Highway, and Sonoma Creek. The 4th district takes in the cities of Santa Rosa, Rohnert Park, Sonoma, and Cotati, the town of Windsor, and the census-designated places of Boyes Hot Spring, Roseland, El Verano, Penngrove.

Solano County is split between this district and the 8th district. They are partitioned by Soda Springs Rd, Union Pacific, Alamo Dr, Leisure Town Rd, Hawkins Rd, Bay Area Exxextric, Shilo Rd, Collinsville Rd, and Montezuma Slough. The 4th district takes in the city of Vacaville, Dixon, Rio Vista, and the census-designated place of Hartley.

Cities & CDP with 10,000 or more people
 Vacaville - 102,386
 Napa - 77,480
 Davis - 66,850
 Woodland - 55,229
 West Sacramento - 53,519
 American Canyon - 21,837
 Clearlake - 15,134

2,500-10,000 people
 University of California, Davis - 6,805
 Hidden Valley Lake - 6,243
 Winters - 6,616
 St. Helena - 5,939
 Calistoga - 5,266
 Lakeport - 4,799
 North Lakeport - 3,514
 Angwin - 3,179
 Yountville - 2,984
 Kelseyville - 2,923
 Clearlake Riviera - 2,850
 Esparto - 2,877

List of members representing the district

Election results for representatives

1872

1874

1876

1878

1880

1882

1884

1886

1888

1890

1892

1894

1896

1898

1900

1902

1904

1906

1908

1910

1912

1914

1916

1918

1920

1922

1924

1926

1928

1930

1932

1934

1936

1938

1940

1942

1944

1946

1948

1950

1952

1954

1956

1958

1960

1962

1964

1966

1968

1970

1972

1974

1976

1978

1980

1982

1984

1986

1988

1990

1992

1994

1996

1998

2000

2002

2004

2006

2008

2010

2012

2014

2016

2018

In 2018, six Democratic candidates filed statements of candidacy with the Federal Election Commission (FEC).  They were, in alphabetical order by last name: Regina Bateson; Roza Calderon; Richard Martin; Robert Lawton; Jessica Morse; and Rochelle Wilcox. Martin and Wilcox dropped out of the race, with Wilcox endorsing Morse in February.   

Retired Air Force Lieutenant Colonel Charlie Brown, who was the Democratic nominee for this seat in 2006 and 2008, was "seriously considering" running in 2018, but decided in June 2017 against a third campaign. In January 2018, Brown endorsed Morse for the nomination. Bob Derlet, the Democratic nominee in 2016, also endorsed Morse in January.

On the Republican side, McClintock has one challenger, Mitchell Kendrick White, who filed with the FEC in January.

In February, the California Democratic Party (CDP) endorsed Jessica Morse in a contested Democratic Nomination. Roza Calderon was able to successfully collect 322 CDP-credentialed delegate signatures needed to block the endorsement, in which Morse only received 44 delegate votes. However, CDP staff refused to accept the forms after it was alleged they closed doors early to prevent the submission. A petition was later filed with the Compliance Review Commission (CRC) by Calderon. The CRC voted to accept and count the signatures, ultimately disqualifying enough signatures to proceed with Morse's endorsement. California allows candidates to include their professional description under their names on the ballot. Regina Bateson later challenged Morse's ballot designation title of "National Security Fellow" at the Sacramento Superior Court after months of controversy that Morse, who had not worked in three years, was "fluffing" her credentials. California's Secretary of State, Alex Padilla, had struck down Morse's 3 ballot designations before Judge Gevercer ruled that she presented "no credible evidence" to use the ballot designation of "National Security Fellow". Instead, he held that this title would mislead the average person about her recent activities. In the official Certified Candidate List, Morse's ballot designation was left blank.

Under the California jungle primary (aka nonpartisan blanket primary) system, only the two candidates with the most votes on June 5, regardless of party, went on to the general election on November 6. Both Republicans and four Democrats appeared on the jungle primary ballot. Morse finished second in the nonpartisan blanket primary in June 2018.

Morse was denied "National Security" as her ballot designation for the November ballot. In the November general election, McClintock held the district with an advantage of more than eight points.

2020

2022

See also
 List of United States congressional districts

References

External links
 GovTrack.us: California's 4th congressional district

 California Citizens Redistricting Commission:  wedrawthelines.ca.gov 2012 final district maps

04
Sierra Nevada (United States)
Government of Alpine County, California
Government of Amador County, California
Government of Calaveras County, California
Government of El Dorado County, California
Government of Fresno County, California
Government of Madera County, California
Government of Mariposa County, California
Government of Nevada County, California
Government of Placer County, California
Government of Tuolumne County, California
Auburn, California
Colfax, California
Placerville, California
Sonora, California
South Lake Tahoe, California
Truckee, California
Constituencies established in 1873
1873 establishments in California